Godbeast Megazord: Return of Green Dragon is a 2016 Chinese animated fantasy adventure film directed by Zhu Xiaobing and Huang Yiqing. The film serves as a sequel for the TV Series Godbeast Megazord, and was released in China by Pearl River Pictures on September 15, 2016.

Plot

Cast
Huang Jian
Li Zhongxin
Xie Ansheng
Zefei
Chen Caiyu

Reception
The film has grossed  at the Chinese box office.

References

Chinese animated fantasy films
2016 animated films
2016 films
Animated adventure films
2010s fantasy adventure films
Chinese fantasy adventure films